Marin Dan (born 30 August 1948) is a retired Romanian handball player. He earned 98 caps for the national team and scored 160 goals, winning the world title in 1974 and an Olympic bronze medal in 1972. After retiring from competitions he worked for the Securitate in a counterintelligence unit. He is married to the Olympic fencer Aurora Dan.

References 

1948 births
Living people
Romanian male handball players
CS Dinamo București (men's handball) players
Handball players at the 1972 Summer Olympics
Olympic handball players of Romania
Olympic bronze medalists for Romania
Olympic medalists in handball
Medalists at the 1972 Summer Olympics